The Hsinchu City Art Site of Railway Warehouse is a historical warehouse in East District, Hsinchu City, Taiwan.

History
The building was originally constructed in 1941 as a station warehouse. In 2004, it was converted into the Hsinchu City Art Site of Railway Warehouse.

Architecture
The building was constructed with Japanese style architecture. It consists of performance hall for exhibitions or events.

Transportation
The building is accessible within walking distance northeast of Hsinchu Station of Taiwan Railways.

See also
 List of tourist attractions in Taiwan

References

External links

 

2004 establishments in Taiwan
Art centers in Hsinchu
Warehouses in Taiwan